Christina Schweinberger (born 29 October 1996) is an Austrian professional racing cyclist, who currently rides for UCI Women's Continental Team Planur-Pura. The Ceratizit Challenge by La Vuelta was the first international race where she gained over 10 UCI points. The following year she won her first international medal in Beerens. She made many UCI Points in Belgium: Beerens, Westhoek, Binche (twice fourth rank), and Hageland, 

In 2022 the Tyrolese participated in the Tour de France Femmes and the European Championships. She also won the National Road Championships, defeating 2021 Olympic champion Anna Kiesenhofer among others, and her first international race that year. Her twin sister Kathrin Schweinberger is also a professional cyclist. Before cycling, they devoted themselves to Judo.

Major results 

2017
 32nd in  Stage 2 in Tour de Feminin - O cenu Českého Švýcarska, Jirikov, Czech 

2018
 18th in Overall Tour of Uppsala, Sweden
 7h in Road Race, National Championships, Vienna

2019
 46th in La Classique Morbihan, Josselin, France
 40th in Tour Cycliste Féminin International de l'Ardèche, France 

2020
 21st Overall in Cerazit Challenge by La Vuelta, Madrid, Spain
 3rd in Time trial, National Road Championships

2021
 2nd in Grote Prijs Beerens, Aartselaar, Belgium
 3rd in Road race, National Road Championships

2022
 10th in European Continental Championships, Landsberg, Germany
 2nd in Dwars door het Hageland, Aarschot, Belgium
 1st   Time trial and Road race in National Road Championships
 3rd Overall Gracia Orlová
1st Stage 3a (ITT)
2023
 8th in Omloop Het Nieuwsblad (132km), Ghent, Belgium

References

External links
 

1996 births
Living people
Austrian female cyclists
21st-century Austrian women
People from Schwaz District
Sportspeople from Tyrol (state)
Twin sportspeople
Austrian twins